Department of Tourism may refer to:
Department of Tourism (Australia), an Australian Government Department that existed between 1991 and 1996
Department of Tourism (Kerala)
Department of Tourism (Philippines)
Department of Tourism (South Africa)